Patrick McMahon (16 October 1908 – 1992) was a Scottish footballer who played in the Football League for Stoke City, West Ham United and Wrexham.

Career
McMahon was born in Glasgow and played for Pollokshaws Hibs and St Anthony's before joining English side West Ham United in 1932. He spent two seasons with the Hammers making 16 appearances before returning to Scotland with St Mirren. He soon moved back down south to Third Division North side Wrexham. He spent five seasons at Racecourse Ground making 113 appearances. In the summer of 1939 he joined Stoke City playing in the first three matches of 1939–40 season. The league was abandoned due to World War II and McMahon moved back to Wrexham to join the home guard and also guested for the football club.

Career statistics
Source:

References

1908 births
1992 deaths
Footballers from Glasgow
Scottish footballers
Association football goalkeepers
St Anthony's F.C. players
West Ham United F.C. players
St Mirren F.C. players
Wrexham A.F.C. players
Stoke City F.C. players
English Football League players

Date of death missing
British Home Guard soldiers